Espen Ramse Knudsen (born 5 March 1991) is a Norwegian football defender.

He represented Norway as a youth international and came through the youth team of IK Start, and made his Eliteserien debut in 2010. In 2012 he joined FK Jerv; at the time a team of minnows which contested the 2013 3. divisjon, but Knudsen took part in successive promotions to the 2016 1. divisjon. At the end of the season, Jerv was only minutes away from yet another promotion, but ultimately lost the decisive playoff match. In 2020 Knudsen surpassed 200 league games for Jerv.

References

1991 births
Living people
Sportspeople from Kristiansand
Norwegian footballers
IK Start players
FK Jerv players
Eliteserien players
Norwegian First Division players
Association football defenders
Norway youth international footballers